Ethmia lugubris is a moth in the family Depressariidae. It is found in Austria, Bulgaria, Romania and Russia.

The larvae have been recorded feeding on Symphytum officinale.

Subspecies
Ethmia lugubris lugubris (Austria, Bulgaria, Romania, Russia)
Ethmia lugubris multidentata Capuse & Szabo, 1983 (Romania)

References

Moths described in 1879
lugubris
Moths of Europe